The International Union of Muslim Scholars (IUMS;) is an organization of Muslim Islamic theologians headed by Ahmad al-Raysuni described as the "supreme authority of the Muslim Brotherhood", founded in 2004, and with headquarters in Qatar and Dublin. 

The IUMS was listed as a terrorist organization by various Arab countries hostile to Qatar, including Egypt, Saudi Arabia, the United Arab Emirates and Bahrain.

Background
The IUMS was "formed in 2004 mostly by scholars belonging to the Muslim Brotherhood". 

According to its website, there are at least 90,000 Muslim scholars to be found in the union, who claim to bring together Sunni, Shia, and Ibadi Muslims. It also accepts all of those who care of and attend to the sciences of Shari’ah and Islamic Civilization, who have significant writings in the field, or have contributed to some tangible activity thereof. According to the IUMS website the IUMS does not follow any certain country, group, or sect. It is not hostile to governments, but rather seeks to open windows of cooperation for the good of Islam and Muslims.

According to president al-Qaradawi, the international union plays a political role in Arab and Muslim issues through mediation efforts. For example, they tried to mediate between various factions in Egypt before 2013 and Yemen before the Houthi expansion. They claim to have conducted successful mediation efforts in Kyrgyzstan in 2010 between the Kyrgyz and the Uzbeks. The IUMS distinguishes itself from other Muslim organizations (being "truly different from all that exists") in its aims to be international.

IUMS is not a local or a regional union, neither an Arab nor a national one, neither an eastern, nor a western union; rather, it represents all of the Muslims in the entire Islamic world, as well as all of the Muslim minorities and Islamic groups outside of the Muslim world.

According to one source, the IUMS was founded to "promote dialogue between Muslim scholars of all stripes and includes prominent Shia figures."

In its "desired characteristics", the IUMS includes being by Muslims for Muslim and about Islam; international; independent of governments(though "not hostile to governments") and sects ("it is only proud of belonging to Islam and its transnational community - Ummah"); interested in scholarly Islamic knowledge, teaching, and education; concerned with the call (Da'wah) to Islam "by tongue, pen, and every contemporary legitimate medium; be it recorded, audio, or visual"; moderation ("the centermost approach of the centermost Ummah"); and vitality.

On interfaith dialogue, unlike moderate Muslim scholars, the IUMS President refused to attend a conference with Jewish rabbis. He also opposed dialogue with Christian communities as "holding meetings with Christians is a waste of time, since they do not recognize Muslims and say that Mohammed (peace and blessings of God be upon him) is dishonest and that he created the Qu'ran and attributed it to himself."

Organization
Scholars who are currently or have been at one time officials include:

Chair
Yusuf al-Qaradawi .

President
Ahmed Raissouni, who resigned in 2022.

Vice presidents

Abdullah Bin Bayyah 
Ahmed bin Mohammed al-Khalili (Grand Mufti of Oman),

Secretary General
Ali Muhiuddin Al-Qurra Daghi .

Other notable figures
Faisal Malawi
Jamal Badawi
Essam Al-Bashir
Salman al-Ouda, who, was Assistant Secretary of the IUMS according to a Saudi legal case against him.

Headquarters 
The IUMS was headquartered at the Islamic Cultural Centre of Ireland near Dublin, Ireland, with the offices of the Secretary General in Nasr City, Egypt.

Funding 
In May 2012, a charity dinner in Qatar raised the equivalent of US$6.5 million for the  “Renaissance of a Nation” endowment project of the IUMS.

According to a 2009 document in WikiLeaks' United States diplomatic cables leak, Qatar's Amir provided his official plans for the IUMS and its president. Another document in the leak, from 2005, said al-Qaradawi enjoys "favors by the Qatari government; in particular, he was given substantial properties including villas, which he rents, and the building which houses the Ruling Family Council, an organization of the Al Thani family". The document said that al-Qaradawi's fortune was "substantial".

Controversies

Terrorism support 
IUMS's leader Yusuf al-Qaradawi, named "the theologian of terror" by Irish media, is banned from entering multiple countries, including the US, UK and France, despite holding a Qatari diplomatic passport. al-Qaradawi was described by The Guardian as a "controversial Islamic scholar", who said that "suicide bombs are a duty". Asked by the BBC about suicide attacks, al-Qaradawi replied: "It's not suicide, it is martyrdom in the name of God". In another interview with Al-Jazeera, he said "our wish should be that we carry out Jihad to death". The Times of Israel reported that he publicly supported terrorist attacks against civilians, while the Irish Independent called him the "theologian of terror".

al-Qaradawi was banned from travelling to the US and the UK because of his support to terrorist groups such as Hamas. British authorities specifically denied al-Qaradawi a visa due to his willingness to "justify acts of terrorist violence or disburse views that could foster intercommunity violence". The Union of Good, a charity group headed by Yusuf al-Qaradawi was formally designated by the US State Department as a "foreign terrorist organization".

British media also reported that Yusuf al-Qaradawi held shares in al-Taqwa, a bank "with terror links", which was listed as a "specially designated global terrorist" by the US. CNN said that al-Taqwa "was sending money to the likes of al Qaeda and Hamas through charitable fronts".

As a result of its alleged links with terrorism, several Arab countries listed IUMS as a terrorist organization. Qaradawi was issued an arrest warrant by an Egyptian court in 2012.

Affiliation to the Muslim Brotherhood 
Reuters wrote that the IUMS was "formed in 2004 mostly by clerics belonging to the Muslim Brotherhood".

Scholar Lorenzo Vidino described the IUMS founder and leader Yusuf al-Qaradawi as the "spiritual leader of the global Muslim Brotherhood". An academic paper published by the Center for Security Policy, said that Yusuf al-Qaradawi was a "long time Muslim Brotherhood leader, who played a key role in the international spread of the Muslim Brotherhood abroad".

According to The Jerusalem Post, Yusuf al-Qaradawi is "a central figure affiliated with the Muslim Brotherhood", adding "many consider him the supreme religious and ideological authority for the Muslim Brotherhood, although he is not officially its leader".

Matthew Levitt, former FBI official, said that "Qaradawi is one of the most public figureheads of the radical wing of the Muslim Brotherhood".

Tariq Ramadan is also a member of IUMS.

Antisemitism 
Israeli media stated that IUMS' founder Yusuf al-Qaradawi "has often made anti-Semitic remarks".

According to the Anti-Defamation League, Yusuf al-Qaradawi is a "radical Muslim Brotherhood ideologue based in Qatar" who called to murder Jews, saying on 9 January 2009 "kill them, down to the very last one".

Apology of rape 
IUMS' founder has been accused of saying that "women can be guilty of provoking a sexual attack if their dress or behaviour arouses a man".

Rape victims stated that Qaradawi's views were "appalling". Lynne Harne, of the Truth About Rape charity, said: "I think that Dr al-Qaradawi's comments are absolutely appalling. Such an attitude should not be tolerated… These kind of views simply promote violence against women, which is prevalent enough".

Violent homophobia 
IUMS' leader Yusuf al-Qaradawi has also been accused of extreme homophobia, as he endorsed the stoning of gay people. The Telegraph wrote that he had "extreme views on homosexuality". In fact, on his website, IUMS' leader said that gay people should either be killed by "burning or stoning".

Views
In 2002, the International Association of Muslim Scholars ruled that resisting occupation troops in Iraq is a “duty” on all able Muslims whether they are in Iraq or outside Iraq and that aiding the occupier was impermissible.

In 2007, the International Union for Muslim Scholars caused controversy when it called for the destruction of the Shrine of Abu Lu'lu'a (located in Kashan, Iran), a suggestion which was not well received by some in Iran, having been perceived as a specifically anti-Iranian act.

In 2008, Salim Al-Awwa, secretary general of the IUMS opposed Egypt's birth control program, stating: "The state is not God and the state is not the creator. We should not try to limit the number of children."

In 2015, the leader of IUMS speaking about Hamas stated, “We view Hamas from the perspective of the Palestinian cause, which must remain the pre-eminent cause not just for the union but for all Arabs, Muslims, and free humanitarians in the world. We stand against oppression, tyranny, displacement and detention tactics that Israeli occupation forces rely on; this is a humanitarian and an international stance. Hamas is defending the rights of the nation, and the nation must stand by those who defend its preeminent cause.”

In 2015, after the Charlie Hebdo attacks, IUMS condemned the publication of a cartoon of Muhammad holding a “Je Suis Charlie” sign with the words, “all is forgiven” written below. The group appealed to Muslims to continue to protest but not to resort to violence.

IUMS condemned the Houthi coup in Yemen. They advised the Houthi to return home and to stop compromising the “legitimate government” of Yemen. They fully endorse the Saudi-led war in Yemen.

From a religious legal perspective IUMS says “one must stand with the legitimate government and cannot back a coup.” They used this mentality to disagree with Saudi Arabia on the coup in Egypt and the ousting of Mohamed Morsi.

While the IUMS President called for a boycott of US products, his son still travelled to the US where he attended non-Islamic universities. From 1991 to 1995, Mohamed Qaradawi was enrolled at the University of Colorado Denver, and then the University of Central Florida, located in Orlando, one of the "10 most fun cities in America" His brother, meanwhile, attended the liberal American University in Cairo.

International relations

On 13 June 2013, Abdullah Bin Bayyah met with Obama administration officials in Washington where he lobbied for help with the Syrian opposition forces. U.S. National Security Council official Gayle Smith asked for the meeting looking for "new mechanisms to communicate with you and the Association of Muslim Scholars". Bin Bayyah also met with Rashad Hussain, U.S. envoy to the Organisation of Islamic Cooperation.

The IUMS was designated a terrorist organization in the United Arab Emirates in 2014, with the Emirati government alleging that the organization has ties to the Muslim Brotherhood. The action was taken amid a controversy between Qatar and other GCC states, during which a number of states downgraded relations with Qatar and recalled their ambassadors as a result of Qatar's backing of the Muslim Brotherhood. The designation was met with skepticism by the United Kingdom and rejection by the United States and Norway. The IUMS rejected the designation and expressed "extreme astonishment of its inclusion by the UAE among the terrorists groups and rejects this description completely," said the group, which says it seeks to promote scholarship and awareness of Islam."

The group waivers between rejection of and support for Russian intervention in the Syrian war. In early 2015, they called for a “rejection of Russian engagement in Syria” but after the appeal of about 40 Muslim scientists in Russia, the Union changed their minds. The Russian Muslim scientists argued that the Union should not allow themselves to be “led by the nose by Western Globalization, and should first try to eliminate the threat of IS together with Russia.” Russian members of the Union appealed to the International organization on the basis that “Russia has never helped create a tense situation in any Arab country.” After the Russian scientists threatened to leave the Union, the IUMS declared that, “the Russian Federation should be actively involved in the restoration of security and peace in Syria.”

References

 
Organizations established in 2004
Non-profit organisations based in Qatar
International Islamic organizations
Islamic organisations based in Qatar
Organizations based in Asia designated as terrorist
Islamist groups
Islamic organizations established in 2004